Marius Coetzer (born 4 April 1984) is a former South African rugby union footballer whose regular playing position was lock.

He then moved to East Rand side the  where he played in 2007 and 2008 before joining the Pumas.

In 2013, he was initially included in a South Africa President's XV team to play in the 2013 IRB Tbilisi Cup, but withdrew after he linked up with the  during the 2013 Super Rugby season.

He was a member of the Pumas side that won the Vodacom Cup for the first time in 2015, beating  24–7 in the final. Coetzer made six appearances during the season.

References

External links

itsrugby.co.uk profile

Living people
1984 births
South African rugby union players
Lions (United Rugby Championship) players
Western Province (rugby union) players
Blue Bulls players
Falcons (rugby union) players
Stormers players
Rugby union locks
Rugby union players from Pretoria
Afrikaner people
Pumas (Currie Cup) players